Nicola J. Allen is a British neuroscientist. Allen studies the role of astrocytes in brain development, homeostasis, and aging. Her work uncovered the critical roles these cells play in brain plasticity and disease. Allen is currently an associate professor at the Salk Institute for Biological Studies and Hearst Foundation Development Chair.

Education 
Allen conducted her undergraduate studies in Anatomical Sciences at the University of Manchester in England. She completed her doctoral degree in Neuroscience at University College London in the United Kingdom in the lab of David Attwell. She was a postdoctoral researcher in the lab of Ben Barres at Stanford University.

Research 
Allen's research focuses on how astrocytes regulate synapses in the brain during disorders such as Alzheimer's disease. In 2012 while she was a postdoc in the lab of Ben Barres, she showed that astrocytes secrete glypican 4 and 6, which is needed to create glutamatergic synapses between neurons.  She later expanded the research on glypican 4, showing that it is needed for the postsynaptic neurons to receive inputs. Allen also showed that astrocytes excrete a protein called Chrdl1, which helps the maturation of the brain. It also increased neuroplasticity in the brains of mice.

Allen uses ribo-tagging, which is a molecular technique to determine which proteins are made by the ribosomes. This technique allowed her to show that astrocytes make a protein that encourages the breakdown of connections between neurons.

Awards and honours 

 Ben Barres Early Career Acceleration Award from the Chan Zuckerberg Initiative (CZI) - 2018
 Pew Scholar - 2015
 Human Frontier Science Program (HFSP) Long Term Fellowship - 2005–2008
 European Molecular Biology Organisation (EMBO) Long Term Fellowship  - 2004–2005
 Wellcome Trust PhD Fellowship - 1999–2003

Selected publications

References 

21st-century British biologists
21st-century British women scientists
British women biologists
Alumni of University College London
Alumni of the University of Manchester
Year of birth missing (living people)
Living people
Salk Institute for Biological Studies people